Milemarker is an American post-hardcore group from North Carolina, United States.

History
Milemarker originally formed in Chapel Hill, North Carolina. For a number of years they were part of the Chapel Hill and Chicago underground music scenes. The band became known for their eclectic stylings; their sound shifted from an experimental electronic format to heavier alternative rock in more recent years. 

In 2001 Milemarker released an album, Anaesthetic on the Jade Tree label. Milemarker released their album Ominosity in 2005, and embarked on a tour of the US in support. The album featured heavy drums following winding guitars and vocals alternating from contemplative and narrative to shrieking and visceral. From 2005 to 2008, although the band did not officially break up, circumstances prevented the band from further recording and touring. 

In 2008, the band played a show with the original line up of Al Burian, Dave Laney, and Ben Davis, and had a 12-date tour in Europe before playing at a musical festival in Lärz, Germany. They toured the US in 2017.

Milemarker often used word play and ironic lyrics in their songs. Examples include "Frigid Forms Sell You Warmth" ("there's a product line attached to every form of suicide") from 2000's Frigid Forms Sell; "A Quick Trip to the Clinic" ("died of pneumonia that I got on the walk to get my flu shot") from 2001's Anaesthetic; "From Russia With Love" ("everybody loves a good Red Scare") from 1999's Changing Caring Humans; and "Virtual Sex" ("it's not too personal to get personable with the personnel") from 2005's Ominosity. The title of the band's six-song EP Satanic Versus—including three tracks recorded by Steve Albini—is itself a play on Salman Rushdie's book "Satanic Verses". Milemarker also often employ a satirical or introspective slant toward social issues such as materialism ("Frigid Forms Sell You Warmth", "A Quick Trip to the Clinic", "Shrink To Fit"), technology ("Internet Relay Chat with the Central Intelligence Agency", "Server Error", "Ant Architect", "Virtual Sex"), and women's roles ("Food For Worms"), and have also referenced Orwellian ("New Lexicon") and apocalyptic ("Tundra", "Sun Out") themes.

Challenger, a more hard rock-oriented side project of Milemarker consisting of original members Al Burian and Dave Laney and newcomer Tim Remis, released their debut album Give People What They Want in Lethal Doses in 2004.

Discography

References

External links
 Milemarker at Last.fm
 Milemarker at MusicBrainz
 Interview with Al Burian
 Milemarker Bandcamp page

American post-hardcore musical groups
Indie rock musical groups from North Carolina
Jade Tree (record label) artists
Musical groups from Chapel Hill-Carrboro, North Carolina